Francisc Szekely (1897 – 1962) was a Romanian footballer who played as a midfielder.

International career
Francisc Szekely played two friendly matches for Romania, making his debut on 31 May 1925 under coach Teofil Morariu in a 4–2 away victory against Bulgaria. His second game was a 6–1 home victory against Bulgaria.

References

External links
 

1897 births
1962 deaths
Romanian footballers
Romania international footballers
Place of birth missing
Association football midfielders
Liga I players
Stăruința Oradea players